HD 24480 is a multiple star system in the northern constellation of Camelopardalis. The brighter component is a giant star with a stellar classification of K4III and an apparent magnitude of 5.20. The companion is a hotter, A- or B-type star that is a suspected spectroscopic binary system.

References

External links
 HR 1205
 CCDM J03571+6107
 Image HD 24480

K-type giants
Double stars
Camelopardalis (constellation)
Durchmusterung objects
024480
018488
1205